Wah Yan College, Hong Kong also referred to by its acronym WYHK is a private Catholic all-boys grant-in-aid secondary education institution run by the China Province of the Society of Jesus in Wan Chai, Hong Kong. It was a non-sectarian school when it was founded, and the Jesuits took over the operation of the school in 1932.

Subsidised by the Government of Hong Kong, WYCHK is a grammar school using English as the medium of instruction (except Chinese and Chinese History). There are around 60 teachers and 800 students. It is a sister school of Wah Yan College, Kowloon.

The school has an enrolment of approximately 800 students with 60 teachers and a few Irish Jesuit fathers. The supervisor of the school is Rev. Fr. Clement Tsui, S.J., who is an alumnus of the school and a Roman Catholic Jesuit priest. The current principal of the school is Dr. Davis Chan, the second alumnus of St. Joseph's College, Hong Kong to become the principal of the college after the founder Mr. Peter Tsui Yan Sau.

History

Chronology

The beginnings
The school was founded by Peter Tsui Yan Sau on 16 December 1919 on the 3rd and 4th floors of 60 Hollywood Road, which houses the Kung-Lee sugar cane juice store (公利真料竹蔗水) and is listed as a Grade II Historic Building. On the first day of school there were only four students. In subsequent years, the school also used 54A Peel Street and 33 Mosque Junction as campuses. As the number of students rose, the school moved to a new campus at 2 Robinson Road (the present site of Bishop Lei Int'l House and Raimondi College) after Lunar New Year 1921. On 1 October 1922, the school was listed as a Grant-in-aid school. In 1924, a Kowloon branch was established in Mongkok. A hostel in Wah Yan opened in 1927. That same year the first Irish Jesuit Fr John Neary came to Wah Yan and taught religious studies.

Wah Yan under the Irish Jesuits

In 1932 the school was transferred to the Society of Jesus, after a long series of negotiations between the original administration and the Jesuit fathers. The transfer was completed on 31 December, and Fr Gallagher, S.J., replaced Lim Hoi Lan as the headmaster. The school was also given a new name: College of Christ the King.

In 1933, the college published the first volume of its yearbook, The Star. A house system was introduced in 1934. In 1940 the hostel was closed down.

Wartime Wah Yan
In December 1941, with the invasion of Hong Kong by Japanese troops, classes were suspended. Fr Gallagher and Fr McAsey were interned by the Japanese.

During the War, Wah Yan continued operations in Macau for a period of time.

There was another Wah Yan set up during the occupation (called "Wah Yan Chung Hok", meaning Wah Yan middle school) but it closed down shortly before the war ended.

Post-war development
After the Japanese troops surrendered, the school reopened on 8 September 1945. Later in the year, Wah Yan Middle School was re-established as the Chinese stream of the school. In March 1946, the Wah Yan Dramatic Society, consisting mainly of alumni of the school and Wah Yan College, Kowloon, commenced activities, and was officially founded the following year. Its first production was "The Thrice Promised Bride".

A night school was started on 17 February 1948. The next year, an afternoon school opened. In 1950 the Chinese stream of the school was closed down.

In 1951, the classes were renamed "forms": Class 1 became Form 6, Class 2 became Form 5, and so on. Class 7 and Class 8 were renamed Primary 6 and 5 respectively.

In 1952 the afternoon school was also closed.

Queens Road East "Mount Parish" era
In 1954, construction for a new campus at Mount Parish, Wan Chai started. On 27 September 1955 the new campus was formally opened by Sir Alexander Grantham, then Governor of Hong Kong.

The school newspaper, "Starlet", was established in 1964. In 1971, Wah Yan College, Hong Kong helped to manage the then Pun U Primary School while the Pun U Association remaining the school sponsoring body. The primary school was renamed Pun U Association Wah Yan Primary School, and was established as the feeder primary school. The night school was closed in 1984. The streaming to Arts and Science began in Form 4 in 1986.

On 12 April 1987, the Gordon Wu Hall to the north of the main building was opened. In the same year, Wah Yan achieved its first "10 A's" in the HKCEE examinations.

On 8 May 1992, heavy rainfall caused a severe landslide at the junction of Kennedy Road and Queen's Road East. It killed the driver of a passing car. The landslide caused the laboratory block to sink. Cracks were found in the playground and a crack in the classroom block had to be covered with stainless steel plates. In the same year three Wah Yan students achieved "10 As" in the HKCEE. Six classrooms (2H, 2K, 4H, 4K, 6S2, 7A) were demolished in 1993 as a result of the landslide. They were rebuilt and were reopened in 1998.

The first version of the school website was set up by Dr Ashley Cheng in 1994. In 1997, the Parent-Teacher Association was established. In 1998, all classrooms were fitted with air-conditioning.

School development project
There had been plans to redevelop the school since 1995. However, the initial plans were aborted due to lack of funds and local law restrictions on architecture. In 2001 the Education and Manpower Bureau planned to upgrade all existing schools in Hong Kong to millennium standard, and the college successfully applied for part of the necessary funds for redevelopment. The School Development Project (SDP) was formally launched on 26 January 2003, and works were officially started on 25 May 2003 with the demolition of the old music room block.

The original aims of the SDP were to:
Upgrade the school campus to millennium standards
Provide extra classrooms required by the "through-train" education mode
Construct a new assembly hall that can accommodate all students at the same time

The total cost of the SDP was estimated to be HK$104m. It was to be carried out in three phases:
Rebuilding the existing music room into a 6-storey multi-use complex. The cost was HK$38.9m.
Extension of Phase 1. The cost was HK$4.82m.
Rebuilding the hall. This phase has yet to be completed and the cost is estimated to be HK$57m.

Funding for Phase 1 is by the Hong Kong Government's Quality Education Fund and the School Improvement Programme. Funding for Phases 2 and 3 are by fund-raising campaigns hosted by the school.

Phases 1 and 2 (New Annex) have already been completed and formally opened on 31 January 2006 by Mr Donald Tsang, the Chief Executive of Hong Kong. Phase III consists of a new school hall annexe with a much larger hall that can accommodate all the students in the school. The annexe will also house five extra classrooms and a lecture theatre.

Phase III was originally estimated to be completed by December 2006; however, lack of funds greatly delayed the completion time. In the summer of 2011, works for Phase III finally started while fund-raising is still in progress. Donors are urged to contact the former principal, Mr Tam Siu Ping George, directly as the college is still sourcing funding. The old school hall has already been demolished. It is contemplated that the new school hall complex will be completed in early 2014.

Achievements

WYHK counts five winners of the Hong Kong Outstanding Students Awards, ranking 16th (tied with La Salle College, Madam Lau Kam Lung Secondary School of MFBM, and Queen Elizabeth School) among all secondary schools in Hong Kong.
The Red Cross cadet group of the college has secured first place in the annual drill competition for 7 years consecutively since 2003.
Wah Yan College, Hong Kong's Scout Group (15th Hong Kong Group) won the prestigious Carlton Trophy in 1982, 1988, 1990, 1992, 1994, 1996, 2004 and 2008.
In 2007 the student organisation of the college participated in the Lunar New Year Stall Competition co-organised by Shell and the Hong Kong Youth Federation, and won the grand prize of $10,000.

Campus

The campus at 281 Queens Road East, Wan Chai has an area of about 20,000 m2 (220,000 square feet), located on a small hill known as Mount Parish. It was designed by the late Professor Gordon Brown, the founder of the Architecture Faculty of Hong Kong University.

Principals

Academics

Class structure
As at the 2012–2013 school year, Wah Yan College has 25 classes: four each in Form 1 to Form 3, Form 5 and Form 6, named "W", "Y", "H", "K" (for "Wah", "Yan", "Hong" and "Kong" respectively) and – to better care for senior secondary classes – starting from 2012 to 2013, five classes in Form 4, named "W", "Y", "C", "H", "K" (where "C" is for "College"). In the coming years, all senior secondary are to have five classes. By 2014–2015, there are 27 classes in the college.

Curriculum
There is no streaming in Forms 1, 2 and 3. A mixed-ability mode is adopted in learning and teaching. Students with different academic abilities are allotted evenly across the classes.

Students of Forms 1 and 2 study: English Language, Chinese Language, Mathematics, Chinese History, History, Geography, Computer Literacy, Integrated Science, Music, Physical Education, Putonghua, Visual Arts, Life Education/Religious Formation and Ignatian Value Education. Form 1 and 2 students also study Life and Society.

Form 3 students study English Language, Chinese Language, Mathematics, Chinese History, History, Geography, Computer Literacy, Physics, Chemistry, Biology, Music, Physical Education, Putonghua, Visual Arts, Liberal Studies, Life Education/Religious Formation and Ignatian Value Education.

Students of Forms 4 to 6 are grouped into different classes according to the optional subjects taken. All students will study courses in English Language, Chinese Language, Mathematics, Liberal Studies (the four core compulsory subjects for Hong Kong Diploma of Secondary Education Examination), Aesthetic Education (Music and Visual Arts), Physical Education, Life Education/Religious Formation and Ignatian Value Education.

In addition, students are required to take three elective subjects for the HKDSE examination. Students can choose among Physics, Chemistry, Biology, Chinese History, Geography, History, Economics, "Business, Accounting and Financial Studies" (BAFS), Information and Communication Technology, Music and "Ethics and Religious Studies" (ERS). Students can also choose to study either Module 1 (Calculus and Statistics) or Module 2 (Calculus and Algebra) of the Mathematics curriculum.

Music (HKDSE), which may be chosen on top of the three elective subjects, is taught outside normal school timetable on Saturdays at Hotung Secondary School.

New senior secondary curriculum
Beginning in the academic year 2009–2010, the school provides a new curriculum for senior students alongside the planned educational reform by the Hong Kong Government.

The HKDSE subjects that are now offered are Chinese Language, English Language, Mathematics, Liberal Studies, Chinese History, Economics, Ethics and Religious Studies, Geography, History, Biology, Chemistry, Physics, 'Business, Accounting & Financial Studies', Music, and 'Information & Communication Technology'.

Music, Art, Ignatian Value Education, and also Religious Formation, Life Education or Moral & Civic Education will be offered as non-examination subjects.

Studying overseas
School statistics show that many of its students participate in overseas exchange programmes organised and subsidised by the school. Many go on to further their studies overseas on a more permanent basis. The most popular destinations are the United States, the United Kingdom, Australia and Canada. To assist such students, teachers of the Careers and Further Studies Committee write reference letters and testimonials. The chairwoman of the committee is Miss H.W. Ng, also the chairwoman of the BAFS panel. Wah Yan also has a Post-secondary Education Trust Fund. Six scholarships and grants, each worth more than HK$300,000 per year (or up to HK$1,200,000 per grant), are awarded to suitable Wah Yan students for overseas undergraduate studies every year. Some of the sponsors are themselves former scholarship beneficiaries.

List of Top Scorers in Public Examinations 
Wah Yan College, Hong Kong has produced 17 perfect scorers "10As" in the history of Hong Kong Certificate of Education Examination (HKCEE) and 1 "Top Scorers" / "Super Top Scorers" in the history of Hong Kong Diploma of Secondary Education Examination (HKDSE).

7 x 5** "Top Scorers" are candidates who obtained perfect scores of 5** in each of the four core subjects and three electives.

8 x 5** "Super Top Scorers" are candidates who obtained seven Level 5** in four core subjects and three electives, and an additional Level 5** in the Mathematics Extended (M1/M2) module.

Extracurricular activities
Extracurricular activities are divided into groups A and B. Group A contains school organisations and clubs/societies operated by students. Group B contains Catholic organisations, sport teams and other unclassified organisations.

Each student may participate in four Group A activities at most. The maximum number of Group B activities that a student may join is left to the discretion of the teacher advisers and parents concerned.

Student Association
The Student Association of Wah Yan College, Hong Kong is the student organisation body which has the highest position in the school's management structure. It is led by current students, with the approval of the School Authorities (the School Authorities refer to the Principal, Assistant Principals, the teacher advisers and the ECA Committee of Wah Yan College, Hong Kong) through yearly Student Association election.

The Student Association (SA) is a non-profit making body, which aims to promote the welfare of the students of WYHK and thus to serve the whole student body. The SA allows the students to participate in the administration of the school in matters concerning their welfare. The primary function of the SA is the organisation and co-ordination of all students; and arrangement of extra-curricular activities in the school.

In the year 2020–21, two cabinet (Novus and Contineo) arose to compete for being the SA. Eventually, Novus won the election by 325 supporting vote, against Contineo's 152 supporting votes, becoming the SA of the next academic year.

List of SA cabinets:

Wu Jieh Yee Library
Located on the second floor of the Francis H B Wong Teaching Building, the Wu Jieh Yee Library of Wah Yan College, Hong Kong was opened in 2005 with the opening of this new annexe.

Prefects' Board
The Prefects' Board is an independent organisation under direct delegation of the Principal. The Prefects' main duties include maintaining discipline at school and promoting harmony among students. Prefects' Board runs a committee system directed under the Head Prefect. The board is also responsible for co-ordinating all internal and external functions held by the school. Every year, approximately 70 prefects are divided into five groups, each with their respective group leaders. Prefects have rights to issue warning slips according to the seriousness of the offence.

Five outstanding prefects are elected each year based on their general routine and external duties performances.

In the academic year 2015–2016, the number to school prefects has reduced to approximately 50 students since the Board's direction has changed to concern quality over quantity.

A Self Recommendation System will also be introduced to recruit more Prefects into the Board.

There are 1–2 development workshops each school year, aiming to enhance the readiness and qualities of prefects. Before summer, there is also a Prefect Training Camp, to prepare Probationary Prefects and the new cabinet of committee members for the challenges they will face in the upcoming school year.

Star Studio
Wah Yan Star Studio is the college's campus TV team. The team handles all audio-visual matters throughout the school year including assemblies and other school events. The team is also responsible for recording the school events and publishing the video recording or describing the events. The team is also free to record and publish interesting videos/dramas filmed by themselves, much like a TV station. All the videos are published online.

The team is considered a school organization and is not interfered by the Student Association.

Houses
There are four houses in Wah Yan. Each house has their own colour.

Students entering the school are each allocated permanently into one of the four houses, based on which class the student is allocated to. Students are mixed up into different classes the following year.

Students' awards
Prizes are awarded to the top 2 or 3 students in each form. Separate awards are given to students in both science and arts streams. There are also prizes for students who achieved the best result in each subject in the HKDSE as well as languages.

The Wah Yan College Alumni Association also offer students and graduates scholarships for local or overseas studies.

Since 2011, 3 secondary 5 students are elected Students of the Year annually. One of them will also be selected as the Student Ambassador who will visit an overseas chapter of the Alumni Association together with the representative from Wah Yan College Kowloon during the summer vacation preceding secondary 6. Until 2011, secondary 6 students competed for the award. In 2011, 3 secondary 5 students taking the first HKDSE and 3 secondary 6 students sitting the last HKALE in 2012 were elected students of the year and one from each group was chosen as the Ambassador.

Notable past winners include Godfrey Lam, currently a Judge of the Court of First Instance of the Hong Kong High Court , and Godwin Leung, a prominent cardiologist in Hong Kong.

To date, 5 students have been awarded the Hong Kong Outstanding Students Awards.

School symbols

School song
The school song was composed around 1960 by Sr. Carmela Santos, a Sister of St Paul de Chartres (SPC) originally from the Philippines. The lyrics were written by Fr. Patrick McGovern, S.J., who was a teacher in Wah Yan and then a member of the Legislative Council.

School seal
The seal of the school is divided into four quarters by a cross in red, set on a blue background. The cross symbolises the love of Jesus Christ for mankind, and the blue background symbolises the sea which surrounds Hong Kong. Five stars are set on the badge, one in each quarter and the remaining one is at the centre of the cross. According to the school, the stars symbolise either the ideas of virtue, wisdom, sportsmanship, co-operation and elegance, or the ideas of benevolence, justice, courtesy, wisdom and faith.

Attempt to switch to DSS system 

The school administration spent nearly three years exploring the idea of joining the "Direct Subsidy Scheme", including a rigorous nine-month consultation of stakeholders. This consultation showed strong support for the scheme among parents and alumni while teachers were evenly split on the issue. The Society of Jesus decided to apply for the school to join the scheme in January 2018. The Education Bureau rejected the application.

As a result, the number of secondary 1 places reserved for graduates of the feeder school, Pun U Association Wah Yan Primary School("PUWY"), will remain at 79. The top 79 primary 6 students will be guaranteed places. PUWY Students may also apply for discretionary places but must go through the same procedures as candidates from other schools.

Notable alumni

Politics/civil service

Legal

Health

Entertainment

Commerce

Education

Religion

Others

LUI Ting Ming, Francis 雷鼎鳴 Professor Emeritus of HKUST, Columnist

Bombs found
Two bombs, home-made IEDs, were found by a janitor and deactivated by police at the school on 9 December 2019, probably linked to the 2019–20 Hong Kong protests. One 20-year-old student was arrested in connection with the incident and charged with possession of firearms and public order offences. The suspect was released on bail pending trial. He attempted to flee to Taiwan but was later caught by the Chinese Public Security officers in the South China Sea along with 11 other people prosecuted by Hong Kong authorities for offences under the Hong Kong National Security Law.

Footnotes

香港華仁書院申請轉直資被拒

See also

Wah Yan College, Kowloon
Wah Yan College Cats
Wah Yan One Family Foundation
Education in Hong Kong
List of buildings and structures in Hong Kong
List of schools in Hong Kong
 List of Jesuit sites

External links

School Homepage
Wah Yan College Hong Kong Wu Jieh Yee Library
Wah Yan International Network
Wah Yan (Hong Kong) Past Students Association

Dr. Rev. Fr. Stephen Chow, S.J., B.A., M.A., M.S.O.D., Ed.D.
 Prefects' Board

Wan Chai
Queen's Road East
Jesuit secondary schools in Hong Kong
Catholic secondary schools in Hong Kong
Educational institutions established in 1919
Wah Yan
1919 establishments in Hong Kong